Sverker Johansson (born 1961) is a Swedish physicist, linguist, textbook author and university professor. He created Lsjbot, a Wikipedia bot.

Biography 
Sverker Johansson studied technical physics at the University of Lund from 1979 to 1982. He moved to the University of Gothenburg in 1982 where he graduated with a Bachelor of Business Administration in 1984.

He performed basic military service at Eksjö and participated in research and experiments in particle physics and particle acceleration at the Super Proton Synchrotron (SPS) and the Large Electron-Positron Storage Ring (LEP).

From November 1990 to June 1992, with the support of the Manne Siegbahn Institute, research was carried out in the field of Neutrino Astronomy Research.

After moving to Jönköping in 1992, he devoted himself to linguistics. His book Origins of Language, Constraints of Hypotheses, and Convergence Evidence in Language and Communication Studies, published in 2005, has been reviewed by the Journal of Linguistics and by American scientists.

From 2007 to 2012, Johansson served as project manager at the University of Chichester in the south of England. From 2009 to May 2013 he was appointed project manager at Jönköping University, where he met his wife.

In 2012, he finished his master's studies in linguistics and presented the theory that Neanderthals used language in "Essay on Neanderthal Language".

Footnotes 

Swedish physicists
1961 births
Living people
Swedish writers
University of Gothenburg alumni
Linguists from Sweden
People from Lund